Lauren Hough (born 11 April 1977) is an American equestrian. She was born in Goshen, New York. She competed in team jumping at the 2000 Summer Olympics in Sydney.

Personal life
In May 2012, it was reported that Hough was in a relationship with Mark Phillips, the former husband of Princess Anne who had recently separated from his second wife Sandy Pflueger.

References

External links

1977 births
Living people
People from Goshen, New York
Sportspeople from New York (state)
American female equestrians
Olympic equestrians of the United States
Equestrians at the 2000 Summer Olympics
Pan American Games medalists in equestrian
Pan American Games bronze medalists for the United States
Equestrians at the 2007 Pan American Games
Equestrians at the 2015 Pan American Games
Medalists at the 2015 Pan American Games
21st-century American women